Tazza: One Eyed Jack is a 2019 South Korean crime drama film directed by Kwon Oh-kwang, starring Park Jeong-min, Ryoo Seung-bum, Choi Yu-hwa, Yoon Je-moon, Woo Hyun and Lee Kwang-soo.

Plot
A young poker player at the top of his game loses everything after he plays for one big jackpot. To save himself from a loan shark settling his debts, he joins a poker team led by the legendary poker player "One-Eyed Jack". While successfully working their plan to win a huge jackpot, a single mistake puts the entire team in a dangerous life or death situation.

Cast

Main
 Park Jeong-min as Do Il-chul 
 Ryoo Seung-bum as One-Eyed Jack
 Choi Yu-hwa as Madonna
 Woo Hyun as Mool
 Yoon Je-moon as Ma-gwi 
 Lee Kwang-soo as Jo Kka-chi 
 Lim Ji-yeon as Young-mi 
 Kwon Hae-hyo as Mr. Kwon
 Lee Chang-hoon as Il-ta
 Oh Hye-won as Bartender
 Oh Dong-min as Cross-eyed
 Lee Hong-nae as a bodyguard

Production 
Principal photography began on September 12, 2018, and wrapped on February 2, 2019.

References

External links

2019 films
2019 crime drama films
South Korean crime drama films
South Korean sequel films
Live-action films based on comics
Films about gambling
Films based on manhwa
Lotte Entertainment films
2010s South Korean films